Agave toumeyana is a plant species endemic to central Arizona.

The species forms dense clumps of rosettes, rarely more than 50 cm high. Flowering stalks can reach 3 meters, bearing greenish-white flowers. Plant was named in honor of James W. Toumey.

References

toumeyana
Flora of Arizona
Plants described in 1920